The 2015 Jackson State Tigers football team  represented Jackson State University in the 2015 NCAA Division I FCS football season. The Tigers were led by second-year head coach Harold Jackson for the first five games of the season before he was fired. Wide receivers coach Derrick McCall was named the interim head coach for the remainder of the season. They played their home games at Mississippi Veterans Memorial Stadium. They were a member of the East Division of the Southwestern Athletic Conference. They finished the season 3–8, 3–6 in SWAC play to finish in a tie for third place in the East Division.

Schedule

References

Jackson State
Jackson State Tigers football seasons
Jackson State Tigers football